This is a list of Portland Trail Blazers executives, since the team's foundation in 1970.

Ownership

Executive management

Basketball operations

References

External links
Official Blazers website